The Western Sahara partition agreement, formally the Convention concerning the State frontier line, was a treaty signed at Rabat on 14 Apr 1976 between Morocco and Mauritania in order to partition the disputed territory of Western Sahara between them following the withdrawal of Spain under the Madrid Accords.

The treaty was intended to demarcate the borders between Morocco and Mauritania as part of the split. The border was defined as a straight line from intersection of the coastline and the 24th parallel north, through the intersection of the 23rd parallel north and the 13th meridian west, and continuing until the pre-existing borders of Mauritania.

It was signed by Hamdi Ould Mouknass, the foreign minister of Mauritania and Ahmed Laraki, foreign minister of Morocco.

References

1976 treaties
Mauritania–Morocco relations
1976 in Morocco
1976 in Mauritania
1976 in Western Sahara
Western Sahara conflict
Mauritania–Western Sahara border